Kilham is a village and civil parish in the East Riding of Yorkshire, England. According to the 2011 UK census, Kilham parish had a population of 1,088, an increase on the 2001 UK census figure of 1,010.

History
In 1823 Kilham civil parish was in the Wapentake of Dickering and the Liberty of St Peter's. A market had previously been held on Thursdays. The parish church was under the patronage of the Dean of York. There existed a free grammar school, founded  by Lord D'Arcy of Aston. A mineral spring near the road to Rudston was supposed curative for disorders. A further spring, called Henpit Hole, was near the road to Langtoft; during a wet autumn it would spout with "violence". A Methodist and a Baptist chapel existed in the village. The population at the time was 971. Occupations included twenty-two farmers, seven shoemakers, five grocers, three of whom were also drapers, four blacksmiths, four tailors, four bricklayers, three joiners, two butchers, two glove makers, a brick & tile maker, a draper, a bacon factor (wholesale tradesman), a plumber & glazier, a bookseller, a saddler, a fellmonger, a corn miller, a gardener & seedsman, and the landlords of the Royal Oak, Plough, Star, and Black Bull public houses. Within the parish were two surgeons, a schoolmaster, four gentlemen and two gentlewomen, a Baptist minister, a curate and a vicar, a yeoman, an Esquire, two Royal Navy masters and a Royal Navy lieutenant. Two carriers operated between the village and Driffield, Beverley, Hull, and Bridlington once a week.

Kilham was once an important market town in the Yorkshire Wolds, bigger and more important than Driffield at one time. It held annual trading fairs and had a large number of businesses and a considerable population. The town declined in size and status following the building of the Driffield Navigation, which took trade away from Kilham to nearby Driffield.

Kilham lies on the line of a Roman road from York to Bridlington, now followed by the minor road known as Woldgate.  To the south of Kilham there is evidence of a Romano-British settlement from the 4th century.

Community
Kilham's Grade I listed Anglican parish church is dedicated to All Saints. The church holds an annual flower festival. Outside the church is an old tethering ring in a stone block – evidence of the cattle trade which once took place in the village. There is also a cast-iron water pump opposite the church.

At one time there were six schools in the village, but only one now remains, Kilham C. of E. primary school.

In 2010 the Kilham Playing Field Association opened a recreational playing field on Back Lane, to provide a full-sized football pitch, a 5-a-side football pitch, grass tennis courts, adventure playground and cycle track.  The Association, a registered charity, has been funded locally and through the Big Lottery fund and Grassroots.

Other villages near Kilham (direct line distances):
Ruston Parva, Harpham, Lowthorpe (2 miles), Nafferton (2 miles), Burton Agnes, Rudston (3 miles), Thwing (3 miles), Little Driffield, Driffield (4 miles), Burton Fleming, Carnaby (5 miles), Foston on the Wolds (5 miles), Boynton (5 miles), Fraisthorpe (5 miles).

Notable residents
David Byas, the former Yorkshire cricket captain, is from Kilham.
Sir Henry Thompson, Lord Mayor of York (1663 & 1672), Deputy Lieutenant of the West Riding of Yorkshire (1665) and MP for York (1673–1873) was born in Kilham.

References

External links

 
 History of Kilham – A Vision of Britain Through Time
 Driffield.co.uk – The Villages of the Yorkshire Wolds, Kilham.
 Genuki: Kilham Parish information from Pigot's 1834.
 Windmillworld – Kilham Windmill, East Yorkshire.
 KPFA – Kilham Playing Field Association
 KilhamSchool.co.uk – Kilham Church of England Primary School

Villages in the East Riding of Yorkshire
Civil parishes in the East Riding of Yorkshire